On the night of April 28, 2016, a Trump rally in Costa Mesa, California was confronted by a crowd of anti-Trump protesters. The protesters became violent and began smashing car windows, even attempting to overturn a police cruiser, and one Trump supporter suffered a bloody gash to the face from a protester. Down the street from where protesters were jumping on a police car, several protesters climbed a traffic light to shout "Fuck Trump," and others began a mosh pit in the middle of the street. The protesters also threw rocks at police lines and scuffled with Trump supporters leaving the event. Traffic was backed up for hours due to the unrest and 20 people were arrested on numerous charges.

References

protests against Donald Trump
Riots and civil disorder in California
2016 riots